Baluan-Pam is an Oceanic language of Manus Province, Papua New Guinea. It is spoken on Baluan Island and on nearby Pam Island. The number of speakers, according to the latest estimate based on the 2000 Census, is 2,000. Speakers on Baluan Island prefer to refer to their language with its native name .

The language is of the agglutinating type with comparatively little productive morphology. Basic constituent order is subject–verb–object (SVO).

Varieties and related languages 
The Baluan Island and Pam Island varieties of the language are practically similar, apart from a number of lexical differences. The language is closely related to Lou, spoken on Lou Island. Lou forms a dialect chain, with the varieties spoken on the far side of the island, facing Manus mainland, differing the most from Paluai and the ones on the side facing Baluan Island being the closest.

In Manus Province, about 32 languages are spoken, all of which belong to the Admiralties branch, a higher-order subgroup of Oceanic, which belongs to the Malayo-Polynesian branch of Austronesian. Most of the languages of Manus Province are scarcely documented. A reference grammar of Loniu was published in 1994.

There is a minority of Titan speakers on Baluan, relatively recent immigrants living in Mouk village. The Titan people have become well known through the work of Margaret Mead. Many speakers have at least a passive command of Titan and Lou. In addition, the creole language Tok Pisin is widely spoken on the island, and most people have at least a basic command of English.

Phonology

Consonant phonemes 
The table below shows the consonant phonemes in the language.

In contrast to many of the Manus languages, there are no bilabial trill or prenasalised consonants. The consonant inventory is rather simple, with a labialised nasal and plosive in addition to bilabial, apico-alveolar and dorso-velar stops and nasals. There is just one fricative, with  being a very marginal phoneme.  has a tap or trill as a variant.

Vowel phonemes 

Syllable structure 
The syllable template is (C)V(C). Not many syllables start with a vowel. Due to loss of word-final consonants and consequently vowels, which is a feature of eastern Admiralties languages, the language allows consonants in the syllable coda and has many monosyllabic words with CVC form.

Word classes

Open classes 
The two major open word classes are noun and verb (with a major subclass of stative verbs), with adjectives and adverbs as minor classes distinguished from both noun and verb and from each other. Verb to noun and verb to adjective derivations are very common, but not vice versa. Most predicates are headed by a verb complex, but nouns, adjectives, numerals and some prepositions can also function as predicate head. Only verbs, however, can take bound pronouns and be modified by tense–aspect–mood (TAM) particles.

Closed classes 
The major closed classes in the language, containing function words, are pronouns, demonstratives, prepositions, numerals, quantifiers, and interrogative words. The pronominal system distinguishes singular, dual, paucal and plural number and first, second and third person, but not gender. The range of adpositional forms is limited, since most spatial relations are expressed either by a directly possessed spatial noun, or by a serial verb construction containing a directional.

Grammar

Nominal morphology 
The language does not have case or number marking on nouns. The only nominal morphology in the language functions to indicate possession. A distinction is made within nominal possessive constructions between direct and indirect possession. This correlates with, but does not coincide completely with, a semantic distinction between inalienable and alienable possession. With direct possession, a suffix indicating person and number of the possessor is added directly to the noun stem. With indirect possession, this suffix is added to a postposed possessive particle . Most kinship terms and body part terms either can or must be used in a direct possessive construction. In addition, spatial nouns, referring to concepts such as "inside", "on top of" and "behind", are obligatorily used in a direct possessive construction.

Verbal morphology 
Verbal derivational morphology is limited to the causative prefix , the applicative suffix , and reduplication.

Causative 
The causative  makes transitive an intransitive verb. Causatives can be productively formed, but only with stative verbs. A causative adds an extra "causer" A argument, demoting the original S argument of the intransitive verb to O position. Examples are  'die, be dead' →  'kill'.

Applicative 
The applicative in this language is a valency-rearranging rather than a valency-increasing device. It promotes an instrumental Oblique constituent of a verb to O position. The original O is not demoted, but rather follows the promoted constituent as a second object. The applicative is typically encountered in one specific discourse/information structure context. It is used as an anaphorical device to refer back to an item mentioned just before, usually in the previous clause, as in the example below:
(1) 
[wo]=pe lêp [suep] a [wo]=pe yil-ek=Ø [ponat]
2sg=PFV take hoe and 2sg=PFV dig-APPL=3sg.ZERO soil
'You will take a hoe and you will dig the ground with it.' [lit. 'dig-with (it) the ground']

Reduplication 
With transitive verbs, full or partial reduplication can be used as an intransitivising device. With intransitive verbs, reduplication adds aspectual meanings such as continuous aspect. A second function of reduplication within the verb class is to derive nominalizations.

Demonstratives 

Demonstratives in Paluai utilise a three-way distinction pattern based upon person (near speaker, near addressee or neither) or relative distance (close, intermediate, distant).

These three distinctions can be defined as 1. position at or very close to the deictic centre, proximate 2. an intermediate position, and 3. a position considered to be significant distance from the deictic centre.

Here the deictic centre refers to the speaker.

When considering discourse deixis, demonstratives will function as anaphors (referring to previously mentioned information) or cataphors (referring forward).

Basic forms as well as forms prefixed by  that are either proximate or distal are usually cataphors.

Demonstratives: basic forms

Three basic forms 
  proximate, 'this'

  intermediate, 'that'

 distal 'that (far)'

The above three demonstratives are often used to modify pronouns as seen in examples 1–2.

1. 

Can mean 'this'.

3sg	DEM.PROX	money		DEM	 ten.kina	ten

'Here. The money is one hundred kina'

2. 

Can mean 'that'

Example of anaphor – refers to previously mentioned discourse

3sg	DEM.INT	perhaps	  speech		my		 DEM	be finished

'That's it. Perhaps my talk is finished'

It is unusual for either three of the basic demonstrative forms to modify nouns and it is also uncommon that the distal form  is used in discourse, rather used to indicate to a distant object.

Demonstratives: the formative  
Forms ,  and  have the ability to modify both nouns and pronouns and are more common in the Paluai language than basic forms of demonstratives.

 is classed as an emphatic marker and is used in conjunction with the basic demonstrative form.

Since forms with  must always modify either a noun or a pronoun, they cannot occur independently.

Examples 3–5 show use of each demonstrative form with formative 

3. 

Proximate demonstrative. Refers to place and time, can mean 'this', 'here' and 'now'

Example of cataphor – refers forward

2sg	   think	banana	EMP-DEM.PROX	be	 Paluai

'Do you think this kind of banana grows on Baluan?'

4. 

Intermediate demonstrative. Used to indicate definiteness 'those'

Example of anaphor, refers to previously mentioned discourse.

Banana	EMP-DEM.INT		3sg	Negation.bunch	one	negation.

'Those bananas, they are not in a bunch'

4b. Unusual case – 

Intermediate demonstrative teyo in this situation is not an anaphor, new participant is mentioned for the first time, not referring to previously mentioned participants.

Line 1. 

Sub	stone	EMP-DEM.INT		person	relative.3sg.	belong	at	 clan

Line 2.	

Possessive	EMP-DEM.PROX	straight	     EMP-DEM.INT		meet	   at

'As for these stones, this person who is straight from our clan encountered them'

5. 	

Distal demonstrative. Can mean 'those (far)'

Example of cataphor – refers forward

Tree two.far EMP-DEM.DIST	go.to be behind

'Those two trees are behind them'

Demonstratives: spatial deictics with  
Another set of demonstratives is formed by prefixing emplatic particle  with preposition  to form a spatial adverbial demonstrative of which has the ability to modify verbs only.

,  and  refer to the location where the activity described by verb is held.

6. 

Proximate demonstrative. Can mean 'here'

2sg	   lie	  at-EMP-DEM.PROX	negation

'You cannot lie here'

7. 

Intermediate demonstrative. Can mean 'there'

Go.up take.rest at-EMP-DEM.INT

'We went up to take a rest there'

8. 

Distal demonstrative. Can mean 'there (far)'

Go.to	take	food	 dry.coconut	one		go.to	 be	at-EMP-DEM.DIST    come

'You go and take my coconut (for me to eat) that is over there, and bring it here'

Demonstrative: free forms with  
This complex demonstrative uses formative , the emphatic particle  and a basic form of demonstrative. In comparison to the earlier mentioned demonstrative forms, free forms with  often have an element of definiteness when referring to a subject/object. It is the one form of demonstrative that can be used independently and can therefore substitute the place of a noun and be the subject or object to a verb in noun phrases. Here the proximate and distal demonstrative function as verbless clause subject, whilst the intermediate demonstrative functions as a transitive object.

9. 

Proximate demonstrative. Can mean 'this' with reference to specific subject or object

Nulik	DEF-EMP-DEM.PROX		possessive	who

'Nulik, whose is this?'

10. 

Intermediate demonstrative. Can mean 'that', as in previously discussed subject/object

Show		be	  DEF-EMP-DEM.INT	go.to	possessive	woman.      EMP-DEM.INT

'She showed all that [what has been talked about just before] to the woman'

11. 

Distal demonstrative. Can mean 'those', as in pointing out a specific subject/object

DEF-EMP-DEM.DIST	star

'Those are stars'

Pronouns

Paradigms 
There are four pronominal paradigms: free subject forms, bound subject forms, object forms and possessive forms. They are formally very similar. Pronouns distinguish singular, dual, paucal and plural number, and have a clusivity distinction. Dual refers to two entities, paucal refers to a few (any number between three and about ten), and plural refers to many. Inclusive pronouns include the addressee ('we, including you'), whereas exclusive ones exclude them ('we, but not you'). Below, the paradigm for the free forms is given.

Directional system

Forms in the paradigm 

The language has a system of directionals composed of ten members, eight of which are specified with regard to an absolute frame of reference (FoR). An absolute FoR is based on fixed bearings, such as where the sun rises or sets or wind directions. In Baluan-Pam the FoR is based on a land-sea axis; a distinction is made between 1) seaward movement, 2) landward movement, and 3) movement parallel to the shore. Therefore, going inland always means going up, and going towards the shore always means going down. In addition, since motion parallel to the shore (i.e. intersecting the land–sea axis) usually means moving on more or less the same level, this has obtained a secondary meaning of 'moving on a horizontal level'. At sea, the system is extrapolated: thus, for moving towards the shore the same directionals are used as for moving inland, and for moving out to sea the same directionals are used as for moving towards the shore when on land.

The directionals are organised along two dimensions: absolute FoR and deixis. The table below shows the paradigm.

The deixis distinction cross-cuts with the FoR distinction, so that five terms are specified for FoR and for deixis, three are specified for FoR only, and two are specified for deixis but not FoR. There is no dedicated term for motion toward the deictic centre parallel to the shore, and no unspecified term that is not deictically anchored (such a term would not add any information to a lexical verb of motion).

Use of directionals 
The directional paradigm provides a very precise reference structure with ample use in discourse. For virtually all actions that in some sense involve motion (including perception-based actions such as seeing/looking, speaking or listening), the direction of the action has to be specified with a directional. In Paluai, this is done by a serial verb construction (SVC), in which a directional either precedes or follows the main verb. Directional SVCs are a common feature of Oceanic languages.

References

Anthropological linguistics
Endangered Austronesian languages
Society of Papua New Guinea
Languages of Manus Province
Admiralty Islands languages